The Toyota Celica LB Turbo was a Group 5 Special Production racecar version of the 3-door liftback first generation Toyota Celica GT built by Schnitzer via Toyota Deutschland to compete in Division 1 of the DRM.

It competed in the German series in 1977 and 1978. Plagued by reliability problems, it finished twice and won a non-championship race. At the end of its European career, it went on to compete in Japan with minor success.

Throughout its competitive seasons, it was the only non-German car to compete in the top division of the German series.

Development
The A20 Celica was built to compete against the Porsche 935s that had dominated international motorsport and also the Division 1 of the German DRM series for Group 5 cars. It was based on the 3-door liftback first generation Toyota Celica GT.

As with all Group 5 cars, the Celica received extensive modifications to the bodywork, which was re-styled and built from lightweight fiberglass. Only the hood, roof, doors and rail panel were retained from the stock model. The Celica's distinctive features are its wider body sills in front of and behind the door panel and sloping nose beyond the bonnet, which encases the double headlamps and square grille.

To keep up with its competitions, Schnitzer used the Toyota 18R-G engine from its production model with a specially designed 16 valve cylinder head and a Kugelfischer fuel injection system topped up with a KKK turbocharger.

Partway through the 1978 season, as the Celica color scheme was changed from blue to red and white, revisions were also made to its bodywork to improve its aerodynamics.

Aside being factory supported, sponsorship was provided by optical manufacturer Rodenstock.

1977
The Celica made its debut in the eighth round of the DRM series in Hockenheimring in July 1977, supporting the German Grand Prix. Driven by Harald Ertl, the blue Celica qualified thirteenth, 25 seconds per lap slower than the pole-winning 935. It retired from the race after four laps. It returned for the following round in Zolder, qualifying seventh, five seconds slower than the pole-winning 935. There it retired after 3 laps. At the final round in Nürburgring, it finished fourth behind three privateer Porsche 935s which it had intended to compete against.

The Celica returned to Zolder for a non-championship ADAC Trophy to score its only victory.

1978
In the 1978 season, Rolf Stommelen, the defending champion with the Gelo Racing Team, a top Porsche privateer, took over driving duties from Ertl, who stepped down to campaign BMWs with the team in the lower Division 2. At the first round in Zolder, the Celica retired from engine failure on its second lap. At the Nürburgring round supporting the Eifelrennen skipping the previous round also at the same track, it retired after four laps. Skipping the next round at AVUS to prepare for the 1000 km Nürburgring, Stommelen partnered with Ertl. Although they qualified sixth, the pair retired with water pump and engine failure. Returning for the following round at Mainz Finthen, they finished eighth behind seven 935s (the highest finishing non-935 in the race). At Hockenheim, after avoiding the previous two rounds, it retired after an accident on the seventh lap, and at Zolder, it retired failing to complete a single lap. It never returned to compete again with two rounds remaining.

After that season, Schnitzer exclusively campaigned BMWs with greater successes.

Japan
In 1979, the Celica was brought over to Japan by TOM'S to compete in the Fuji Super Silhouette Series by its company founder, Nobuhide Tachi. In four of the five rounds held at Fuji Speedway he competed in, he won on its third attempt, only to retire on all others.

Retired in favour of their RA40 Celica that was developed in conjunction with Dome, the car was later sold to Trust Japan in 1981, which then later reverted the front nose back to the original Schnitzer version configuration. Under Kaoru Hoshino, it retired on its first round at Fuji, then finished ninth, six laps behind the winning Nissan Bluebird of Haruto Yanagida. Subsequently it finished third and then eighth.

In 1982, Hoshino retired in his next two races with the car after five and four laps respectively at Fuji. In its final round at Tsukuba Circuit, driven by Tatsuhiko Kaneumi, it finished fifth. The following year, the Schnitzer Celica was retired in favour of the newly acquired Porsche 956 to compete in the newly introduced All Japan Endurance Championship. The Celica resurfaced again for its final appearance again at the same final round at Tsukuba, managing to finish ninth.

Since the car was sold off, prior to the collapse of the super silhouette series in 1984, very little is known of its history. Nothing was heard of the car until it was discovered in the 2000s in a junkyard in Japan in a neglected state with its Trust color scheme.

Models
Despite its limited success in the series in spite of its claim it "won the German National Championship in 1977" printed on its catalogue and its subsequent editions, the DRM liftback was immortalised in several different versions.

Tamiya released static plastic model kits in both 1/20 and 1/24 scale, and the 1/24 version was re-released several times until the late 2000s.

Tamiya also produced two different radio controlled car kits. The initial 1/12 scale version was released in 1977, followed by a bigger 1/10 scale version with polycarbonate body in 2012.

Bburago made a 1/24 scale toy model with metal body.

In 2003, slotcar manufacturer MRRC produced a 1/32 scale slotcar in different liveries, including a black colored fantasy "GSR" livery as a promotional item for the spanish Guia Slot Racing Magazine.

References 

Grand tourer racing cars
24 Hours of Le Mans race cars
Celica LB Turbo
One-off cars